The Hemlock River is a  river in Michigan in the United States. It is a tributary of the Paint River, which flows to the Brule River, then the Menominee River, and ultimately Lake Michigan.

See also
List of rivers of Michigan

References

Michigan  Streamflow Data from the USGS

Rivers of Michigan
Tributaries of Lake Michigan